Robert Esmond Bainbridge (22 February 1931 – 16 October 2021), also known as Bobby Bainbridge, was an English professional footballer who played as a striker in the Football League for York City, in non-League football for Cliftonville, Terrys, Frickley Colliery, Denaby United and Selby Town.

Bainbridge died on 16 October 2021, at the age of 90.

References

1931 births
2021 deaths
Footballers from York
English footballers
Association football forwards
York City F.C. players
Frickley Athletic F.C. players
Denaby United F.C. players
Selby Town F.C. players
English Football League players